Andarine (developmental code names GTx-007, S-4) is an investigational selective androgen receptor modulator (SARM) developed by GTX, Inc for treatment of conditions such as muscle wasting, osteoporosis and benign prostatic hypertrophy, using the nonsteroidal antiandrogen bicalutamide as a lead compound.

Andarine is an orally active partial agonist of the androgen receptor (AR). In intact male rats, 0.5 mg andarine daily was shown to reduce prostate weight to 79.4%, and non-significantly increased levator ani muscle weight. In castrated male rats, this dose restored only 32.5% prostate weight, but 101%  levator ani muscle weight  This suggests that andarine is able to competitively block binding of dihydrotestosterone to its receptor targets in the prostate gland, but its partial agonist actions at the androgen receptor  prevent the side effects associated with the antiandrogens traditionally used for treatment of BPH.

See also
 Acetothiolutamide
 Enobosarm

References

Carboxamides
Phenol ethers
Selective androgen receptor modulators
Trifluoromethyl compounds